Kisan and Khet Mazdoor Congress (abbreviated as KKMC) is a trade union of agricultural labourers in India. KKMC is the labour wing of Indian National Congress. Nana Patole is the Chairman of KKMC since 2018.

References 

Trade unions in India
Trade unions established in 1910